They Will All Die in Space (Spanish:Morirán en el espacio or Ellos morirán en el espacio) is a 2015 English-language Spanish short science-fiction horror film written, directed and produced by Javier Chillon, about a starship technician (Julio Perillán) who is awoken from cryo-sleep and is told that the vessel is adrift and lost in the cosmos, and that he is needed to help repair the communications system to call for help, but quickly realises that something has gone horrifyingly wrong. Chillon's third short film was shown at well over 300 film festivals between 2015 and the end of 2019, and has won approximately sixty awards and honours, including Best Short Film from the 2015 Sitges Film Festival, the most important fantastic film festival in Spain.

In 2017, They Will All Die in Space received a general theatrical release through its inclusion in the Canadian science-fiction horror anthology film, Galaxy of Horrors.

Plot
Phil Eberhart (Ben Temple) and Dan Atenas (Francesc Garrido) are crew members of the starship Tantalus. Dan removes Alexander Talabot (Julio Perillán) from one of dozens of cryogenic chambers aboard the ship. Phil explains to Alexander that they have reanimated him because an asteroid shower nearly destroyed the Tantalus four months after departure; the crew has been adrift for six months without any form of communication and having lost its main engine. Alexander suggests that they reanimate his wife, who has the technical skills to help the men out of their predicament, but Eberhart tells him that the ship is doomed to drift through space until supplies run out, and asks Alexander if that is the fate to which he wants to subject his wife. As Alexander works on repairs, he grows more suspicious about Phil and Dan.

Cast
Francesc Garrido as Dan Atenas
Julio Perillán as Alex Talabot
Ben Temple as Phil Eberhart

Themes, genre, and influences
After directing two other short films involving returning astronauts (one of which a chimpanzee), the mockumentary Die Schneider Krankheit (2008) and Decapoda Shock (2011), Javier Chillon wanted to do something a bit more conventional, a film that was "straight up science fiction" with no supernatural elements, something closer to a detective story: he had always liked the idea of a starship stranded in space, and one day the story just came to him. While classic science fiction films like Alien and Outland were major inspirations, Chillon was mainly influenced by what helped inspire those films in the first place: "the whole French new wave of science fiction comic books in the 60s and 70s," such as Métal hurlant, Valérian, and artists such as Moebius, Enki Bilal, Juan Giménez, and Frederik Peeters.

Production

Development and support
Chillon worked on the film for four years (from script writing to filming was three years), keeping costs down by borrowing space and equipment from his associate producers: a sound stage belonging to Behind the Movies, and a RED camera from Morituri.

Design, effects, and filming
The biggest part of the project was the sets, which Chillon and his crew built "from scratch" with a view to minimising the need for CGI, but also for aesthetic reasons related to his influences. Most of the visual effects are old-fashioned models made with the help of José Luis Orive (called "Rambo") to create different spaces on the ship; the relatively little CGI was done by User T38, integrating, creating the astronaut in 3D, the spacecraft, and so on.

Chillon said the three actors, Francesc Garrido, Julio Perillán and Ben Temple, understood their roles and the tone of the story perfectly. Chillon and his director of photography, Luis Fuentes, thought of the film as something of a mixture of science fiction and thriller, and decided to shoot the film in black and white to inject a sense of noir into the story.

Release
They Will All Die in Space had its premiere at the 35th Fantafestival in Rome on 25 June 2015. In less than two years, the short had been selected for nearly 300 film festivals worldwide, where it received much praise. By March 2019, the short had been shown at 336 festivals.

Anthology film
They Will All Die in Space is included in the 2017 Canadian science-fiction horror anthology film Galaxy of Horrors, which comprises eight shorts within a larger narrative frame in which a man awakens from a cryogenic sleep pod and is forced to watch the shorts as entertainment while his damaged life-support runs out. The anthology film had its premiere in Toronto at Imagine Cinemas Carlton on 1 March 2017. the feature was conceived by Little Terrors short films festival founder Justin McConnell, who directed the narrative frame, and Indiecan Entertainment's Avi Federgreen. The production is the second collaboration between Rue Morgue Cinema and Little Terrors, following Minutes Past Midnight.

Home media and streaming
The film is available to view on Vimeo in its entirety, and is a Vimeo Staff Pick.

The Galaxy of Horrors anthology was released on DVD and special edition Blu-ray in 2017. The anthology was made available through various video on demand options on the IndieCan Entertainment website, on 7 March 2017, and on Amazon Prime.

Reception

Critical response
They Will All Die in Space made Shawn Herbert's top ten list of "life changing short films" in 2018, saying it was "an interesting watch, especially for those who enjoy having goosebumps!" Peter Martin called the film an "extremely well-crafted film", while Terek Puckett said "Chillon delivers a great piece of space horror with a grim tone reminiscent of many American science fiction feature films of the early 1970s." Richard Sopko concurred, and averred: "It's well acted so there's an immediate engagement with the characters." Carl Fisher compared the claustrophobic feel to Alien and considered the film the best of the eight in the Canadian anthology. Jeff Spry, writing for Syfy Wire, called it "an exceptional example of the short film form, filled with fluid camerawork", actors who are "invested in the material," brooding music, and "an unappetizing twist on a familiar trope in outer-space movies"; a film "gorgeous to watch, even when the horrifying mystery unfolds". Andrew Liptak said it channels the claustrophobic tension of Alien and the desperate situation of Passengers, and "ends with a neat twist that pays off exceptionally well." Cheryl Eddy of io9 enjoyed the "crisp black-and-white" and "sinister new spin" on the otherwise familiar story of a space ship filled with humans slumbering in cryogenic chambers encounters catastrophic troubles in deep space. Joseph Perry praised all elements of the film:Chillon's script runs lean and mean, building toward an exciting payoff. The three actors turn in splendid performances. Art direction/production design head Idoia Esteban and her visual effects crew have created a stunning world of, in, and outside of the spaceship, including a marvelously rendered design of the Tantalus by Stephane Chasseloup. Set dressers Victor Lopez and Alvaro Suarez, along with the rest of the short's art department, have done a first-rate job building impressive set designs for the ship's interior. Luis Fuentes's cinematography is striking, and the choice of filming in black-and-white fits the somber tone of the proceedings perfectly. A fittingly eerie synthesizer score by Cirilo Fernandez works in tandem with Roberto Fernandez's sound design.

Alisha Bunting praises the cinematography, sound design, and the acting, which "matched the film", wishing there had been a bit more shown of the two waking crew interacting while the protagonist is in cryogenesis, and hoped the short would be converted into a feature.

Accolades
By September 2017, They Will All Die in Space had won sixty awards or special mentions from film festivals worldwide.

2015

2016

References

External links
Official online release on Vimeo
They Will All Die in Space on IMDb

2015 films
2015 short films
2015 horror films
2010s science fiction horror films
Spanish short films
Spanish drama films
Spanish science fiction horror films
2010s psychological drama films
2015 drama films
2010s English-language films